Iwona Teresa Stroynowski née Fleszar (born 1950) is a Polish-born American immunologist who is Professor in the Department of Immunology and Microbiology at University of Texas Southwestern Medical Center in Dallas, TX.  She discovered the process of gene expression control called attenuation early in her career, the first example of a riboswitch mechanism.

Early life and education 
Stroynowski received a PhD from Stanford University in 1979 in the field of Genetics under the supervision of Joshua Lederberg. She became an American citizen in 1982. At Stanford, working with Charles Yanofsky, she discovered the attenuation system regulating bacterial amino acid synthesis pathways.

Academic and research career 
Stroynowski undertook an extended postdoctoral research period with Leroy Hood at California Institute of Technology, during which she changed fields from bacterial genetics to cellular immunology.  Then she became an associate professor at University of Texas Southwestern Medical Center in the Department of Immunology and Microbiology. Her current rank there is Professor of Immunology and Microbiology. Stroynowski's research has delved into the functions of the non-canonical proteins of the Major Histocompatibility Complex, particularly Qa, a protein which is produced in both membrane bound and soluble forms from the same gene, due to alternative splicing. Interferon induction of H-2 antigens was another of her findings. One of her most important findings is that the Qa antigen, a non-variable histocompatibility antigen, has a role in protection from tumor formation.

References

External links

 

Women molecular biologists
Polish immunologists
Polish molecular biologists
California Institute of Technology people
1950 births
Living people
Polish emigrants to the United States
Stanford University alumni
University of Texas Southwestern Medical Center faculty